Wyvern College may refer to:

Wyvern College, Hampshire, a secondary school in Eastleigh, Hampshire, England
Wyvern College, the former name of Wyvern St Edmund's, a secondary school near Salisbury, Wiltshire, England

See also
Wyvern (disambiguation)